Leptosiphon bicolor (syn. Linanthus bicolor), known as true babystars, is a low annual flowering plant with clumps of needle-like leaves. Populations often contain both white-flowered and pink-flowered plants. It is native to the west coast of North America from northern Baja California to southern British Columbia.

External links
Calflora Database: Leptosiphon bicolor (True babystars)
Jepson Manual eFlora (TJM2) treatment of Leptosiphon bicolor
UC CalPhotos gallery: Leptosiphon bicolor

bicolor
Flora of California
Flora of Oregon
Flora of Washington (state)
Flora of the Sierra Nevada (United States)
Natural history of the California chaparral and woodlands
Natural history of the California Coast Ranges
Natural history of the Central Valley (California)
Natural history of the Transverse Ranges
Plants described in 1848
Flora without expected TNC conservation status